Antonio Cristian Glauder García (born 18 October 1995), sometimes known as Antonio Cristian or Antonio Glauder, is a Spanish professional footballer who plays as a central defender for Albacete Balompié.

Club career
Glauder was born in Algeciras, Cádiz, Andalusia, and represented Algeciras CF, Cádiz CF, FC Barcelona and Villarreal CF as a youth. He made his senior debut for the latter's C-team on 3 September 2014, coming on as a second-half substitute and being sent off in a 1–1 Tercera División away draw against CD Acero.

On 6 July 2015, Glauder signed a two-year contract RCD Espanyol, being assigned to the reserves in Segunda División B. On 7 July 2017, he agreed to a three-year deal with Deportivo Alavés, and was immediately loaned to Croatian First Football League club NK Rudeš for one year.

Glauder made his professional debut on 28 July 2017, starting in a 1–1 away draw against NK Lokomotiva. On 18 July of the following year, he joined third division side CF Fuenlabrada on loan for one year.

On 9 July 2019, after being an undisputed starter as his club achieved promotion to Segunda División for the first time ever, Glauder signed a permanent one-year deal with Fuenla. He scored his first professional goal on 25 August, netting the winner in a 2–1 away success over Extremadura UD.

On 30 June 2021, Glauder signed a two-year contract with SD Eibar. On 31 August of the following year, after featuring sparingly, he terminated his link, and signed a one-year deal with fellow second division side Albacete Balompié the following day.

References

External links

1995 births
Living people
Footballers from Algeciras
Spanish footballers
Association football defenders
Segunda División players
Segunda División B players
Tercera División players
Villarreal CF C players
RCD Espanyol B footballers
Deportivo Alavés players
NK Rudeš players
CF Fuenlabrada footballers
SD Eibar footballers
Albacete Balompié players
Croatian Football League players
Spanish expatriate footballers
Expatriate footballers in Croatia
Spanish expatriate sportspeople in Croatia